Delta Sigma Delta, founded on , is the oldest and largest of the international professional dental fraternities, pre-dating Xi Psi Phi (1889), Psi Omega (1892) and Alpha Omega (1907).

History
Its inception came when two dental students, Lou Mitchell and Chas Howard, of the University of Michigan School of Dentistry in Ann Arbor were invited to join a medical fraternity, Nu Sigma Nu.  They declined, instead opting to form the school's first professional dental fraternity. On , these two and five others from the dental school met at "Mrs. Slattery's boarding house", located at #10 North State St., Ann Arbor, Michigan, and there established what they soon realized was to be the first dental fraternity in the world.  The founders were:

As its name, they transposed the initials of the D.D.S. degree, which they were soon to receive,  to D.S.D., substituting the Greek letters  for the English. Thus, Delta Sigma Delta was born. Already planning on national expansion, the Michigan group was known as the Alpha chapter.

After graduation these men took positions in multiple cities, still desirous to maintain the relationships of their college days.  This led to the formation of a Supreme (or Alumni) chapter, which was  founded in Detroit, MI after their graduation from dental school in 1895.

Soon a second chapter, Beta chapter, was formed at the Chicago College of Dental Surgery in 1885 by Dr. L.L. Davis who had set up his dental practice in the city. Epsilon chapter at Penn and Gamma chapter, at Harvard were established soon after, within a month of each other.

Chapters
As of 2021 there were 44 active chapters.

Undergraduate (~collegiate) chapters are located at dental schools, while Graduate chapters are located in population centers throughout the United States and Canada, as well as Europe, Asia, and Australia. The Supreme Council is designated as the administrative or governing body of the fraternity.

Chapters of Delta Sigma Delta:

See also
 List of dental schools in the United States
 List of defunct dental schools in the United States
 Professional fraternities and sororities

References 

Professional dental fraternities and sororities in the United States
Student organizations established in 1882
Former members of Professional Fraternity Association
1882 establishments in Michigan